Gilroyd is a village in the Metropolitan Borough of Barnsley in South Yorkshire, England. The village falls within the Dodworth ward of Barnsley MBC.

External links 

Villages in South Yorkshire
Geography of the Metropolitan Borough of Barnsley